The ocellated antbird (Phaenostictus mcleannani) is a species of antbird in the family Thamnophilidae. It is monotypic within the genus Phaenostictus and is found in southern Central America and the northwestern part of South America. Its natural habitat is the understory of tropical moist lowland forest, foothill forest, and tall secondary growth woodlands.

The species is 19 cm long and weighs around 50 g. The eye is surrounded by a large area of bare blue coloured skin. The plumage varies slightly amongst the three subspecies, but overall it has a grey crown, black throat with a buff breast changing into a spotted belly and back.

The bird feeds primarily on insects, arthropods, and sometimes on small lizards. Most of its prey is obtained from trails of army ants, which flush the prey from hiding places. One such army ant species is Eciton burchellii. The ocellated antbird is considered an obligate follower of army ants, seldom foraging away from swarms. Amongst the species of antbirds and other army ant followers (such as tanagers and woodcreepers) it is usually a dominant species.

The social biology of this species is unusual for the antbird family. The breeding pair form the nucleus of a group or clan that includes their male offspring and their mates. These clans work together to defend territories against rivals. The open nest cup was only recently described, with a clutch of two eggs.

Taxonomy

The ocellated antbird was formally described in 1861 by the American amateur ornithologist George Newbold Lawrence and given the binomial name Phlogopsis mcleannani (misspelled as Meleannani). The specific epithet honours James McLeannan, a railway engineer on the Panama Canal Railway, who had collected the specimen in Panama. The ocellated antbird is now placed in the genus Phaenostictus that was erected in 1909 by the American ornithologist Robert Ridgway. The genus name is derived from the Ancient Greek phainō meaning "to display" and stiktos for "spotted". Ridgway considered that the species was related to the genus Phlegopsis (the bare-eyes) but that it differed in having a longer tail, rounded nostrils and a few other characters.

Molecular phylogenetic studies of the antbird family, Thamnophilidae, have found that the ocellated antbird sits in the tribe Pithyini and its closest relatives are found in the genus Pithys.

Three subspecies have been described:
P. m. saturatus (Richmond, 1896)
P. m. mcleannani (Lawrence, 1861) 
P. m. pacificus Hellmayr, 1924

Description
Females tend to be slightly smaller than males and weigh slightly less. The plumage and bare parts of the male and female are the same. The eye is surrounded by a large bare blue patch of skin. The head and throat is black with a grey  and a rufous . The rest of the feathers of the wing are black edged with olive. The breast is rufous and belly is olive brown, both have large black spots. The bill is large and black. Juvenile birds have a darker crown, the rufous areas are brighter and the spots are reduced or absent. The species conforms with Bergmann's rule, with birds closer to the Equator having smaller wings and bills than those further away.

Distribution and habitat
The ocellated antbird ranges from Honduras to Ecuador. The race saturatus is found from northern and eastern Honduras through eastern Nicaragua, eastern and northern Costa Rica into the west of Panama. The nominate race is found in the rest of Panama and the Pacific slope as the Andean slope of western Colombia. The race pacificus is found in the extreme south of coastal Colombia and northwestern Ecuador.

The ocellated antbird is a rainforest bird, being found in lowland and hill primary rainforest, as well as secondary forest. Within this habitat it occupies the understory of the forest, feeding and living close to the forest floor. They seldom enter or cross open areas, unless the ants that they are following do so.

References

Cited text

ocellated antbird
Birds of Honduras
Birds of Nicaragua
Birds of Costa Rica
Birds of Panama
Birds of the Tumbes-Chocó-Magdalena
ocellated antbird
Taxonomy articles created by Polbot